Vincenzo Brancaleoni (died August 1588) was a Roman Catholic prelate who served as Bishop of Teano (1588).

Biography
On 9 March 1588, Vincenzo Brancaleoni was appointed by Pope Sixtus V as Bishop of Teano.
He served as Bishop of Teano until his death in August 1588.

See also
Catholic Church in Italy

References

External links and additional sources
 (for Chronology of Bishops) 
 (for Chronology of Bishops) 

1588 deaths
16th-century Italian Roman Catholic bishops
Bishops appointed by Pope Sixtus V